Dragiša Žunić (Serbian Cyrillic: Драгиша Жунић; born 29 June 1978) is a Serbian former footballer who played as a defender.

Honours
Mladost Lučani
 Serbian First League: 2006–07

External links
 

1978 births
Living people
People from Požega, Serbia
Serbian footballers
Association football defenders
FK Mladost Lučani players
FK Vojvodina players
FK Javor Ivanjica players
FK Jagodina players
FK Metalac Gornji Milanovac players
FK Jedinstvo Užice players
Serbian SuperLiga players